Portobelillo is a corregimiento in Parita District, Herrera Province, Panama with a population of 892 as of 2010. Its population as of 1990 was 890; its population as of 2000 was 906.

References

Corregimientos of Herrera Province